Gartental is a Mennonite agricultural settlement in Río Negro Department, Uruguay. It is located  NW of Montevideo, near San Javier, not far from Route 24.

Established in 1951 by Vistula delta Mennonites who came from West Prussia, Danzig and Poland to Uruguay. Its German name means "garden valley".

Previously the area had a German school, Deutsche Schule Gartental.

See also
El Ombú
Mennonites in Uruguay

References

External links

 

1951 establishments in Uruguay
German immigration to Uruguay
Polish diaspora in South America
Populated places established in 1951
Mennonitism in Uruguay
Populated places in the Río Negro Department
Religion in Río Negro Department
Vistula delta Mennonites